Volujak may refer to:

 Volujak, Kreševo, a village in Bosnia and Herzegovina
 Volujak (mountain), mountain on the border of Bosnia and Herzegovina and Montenegro
 Volujak, Kosovo, hamlet in Kosovo
 Maja e Vjelakut, in Kosovo
 Voluyak, a village in Sofia City Province, Bulgaria

See also 

 Goljak